Powerhouse is the fourth studio album of English musician Planningtorock. The album was critically well-received and landed at number 27 on The Quietuss list of the best albums of 2018.

Critical reception
Powerhouse was met with "generally favorable" reviews from critics. At Metacritic, which assigns a weighted average rating out of 100 to reviews from mainstream publications, this release received an average score of 74, based on 7 reviews.

Track listing

References 

Planningtorock albums
2018 albums
DFA Records albums